Drayton Entertainment is a not-for-profit professional theatre company based in Southwestern Ontario operating seven venues across the province: the original Drayton Festival Theatre in Drayton, Huron Country Playhouse and Playhouse II in Grand Bend, King's Wharf Theatre in Penetanguishene, Schoolhouse Theatre in St. Jacobs, St. Jacobs Country Playhouse in Waterloo, and Hamilton Family Theatre Cambridge, formerly Dunfield Theatre Cambridge in Cambridge.

The following is a chronological list of the productions that have been staged as part of Drayton Entertainment since its inception in 1991.

2019 season 

Annie
Art
Beauty and the Beast
ELF: The Musical
 Fiddler on the Loose
 Glory
 Good Ol' Country Gospel
Grease
 Jack and the Beanstalk: The Panto
The Miracle Worker
Disney's Newsies
Priscilla, Queen of the Desert
Rocky: The Musical
Shear Madness
 Sleeping Beauty: The Panto
Thoroughly Modern Millie
Twelve Angry Men
You'll Get Used To It! ... The War Show

2018 season 

 The Birds and The Bees
 Canada 151: Better Late Than Sorry
 Cinderella: The Panto
 Cruisin' Classics
The Drowsy Chaperone
Ghost: The Musical
Hairspray
Holiday Inn
 Jack and the Beanstalk: The Panto
 Jonas & Barry in the Home
 Kings & Queens of Country
The Little Mermaid
Man of La Mancha
Out of Order
The Rainmaker
Shear Madness
West Side Story

2017 season 
All Shook Up
Beauty and the Beast
Death of a Salesman
Harvest
Honk!
 Jonas & Barry in the Home
Joseph and the Amazing Technicolor Dreamcoat
 Kings & Queens of Country
Lucky Stiff
 Marathon of Hope: The Musical
Million Dollar Quartet
 Office Hours   
 One For The Pot
Rock of Ages
Singin' in the Rain
The 39 Steps
Thoroughly Modern Millie

2016 season 
 Aladdin: The Panto
All Shook Up
Anything Goes
Brighton Beach Memoirs
 Canadian Legends
 Cinderella: The Panto
Footloose
 Hilda's Yard
 It Runs In The Family
 The Ladies Foursome
 Legends ... of Rock ‘n’ Roll   
Little Shop of Horrors
Mamma Mia!
 Marathon of Hope: The Musical
 The Men's Foursome
 Red Rock Diner
Sister Act
Smokey Joe's Cafe
 Unnecessary Farce

2015 season

Aladdin: The Panto
Anne of Green Gables
Canadian Legends
Chicago
Footloose
Hilda's Yard
Irving Berlin's White Christmas
Last Chance Romance
Legends...of Rock 'n' Roll
Looking
Monty Python's Spamalot
Sexy Laundry
Snow White: The Panto
The Crazy Time
The Last Resort
The Music Man
 The Odd Couple
 The Pirates of Penzance
 The Wizard of Oz

2014 season

A Closer Walk With Patsy Cline - Conceived & Written by Dean Regan
Boeing Boeing - By Marc Camoletti
Broadway Heroes - Created & Performed by David Rogers
Damn Yankees - Words & Music by Richard Adler & Jerry Ross
Deathtrap - By Ira Levin
Disney's The Little Mermaid - Music by Alan Menken Lyrics by Howard Ashman & Glenn Slater Book by Doug Wright
Footloose - Stage Adaptation by Dean Pitchford & Walter Bobbie
Hollywood Sings - Created by David Hogan & David Rogers
I'll Be Back Before Midnight - By Peter Colley
Legally Blonde - Music & Lyrics by Laurence O’Keefe & Nell Benjamin
Look, No Hans! - By John Chapman & Michael Pertwee
Peter Pan - Written by Simon Aylin & Trudy Moffatt
Run For Your Wife - By Ray Cooney
Snow White: The Panto - 
Rodgers & Hammerstein's South Pacific - Music by Richard Rodgers
The Affections of May - By Norm Foster
The Freddy Fusion Science Magic Show
Twist and Shout: The British Invasion - Conceived, Written & Directed by Alex Mustakas
Wichita Lineman - Conceived & Created by Leisa Way
South Pacific
Damn Yankees
Twist and Shout: The British Invasion
Les Misérables

2013 season 

Big Band Legends - Conceived & Directed by Alex Mustakas
Buddy - The Buddy Holly Story - Book by Alan James
Godspell - Book by John Michael Tebelak
Johnny and June - Created by Chris McHarge & Colin Stewart
Legends of Harmony - Conceived & Directed by Alex Mustakas
Lend Me A Tenor - By Ken Ludwig
The Love List - By Norm Foster
Mary Poppins - A Musical based on the stories of P.L. Travers and Walt Disney Film
Oliver! - Music, Lyrics & Book by Lionel Bart
Peter Pan - Written by Simon Aylin & Trudy Moffatt
The Songs of Sinatra - Conceived, Written & Directed by David Rogers
Too Many Cooks - By Marcia Kash & Douglas E. Hughes
Tuesdays With Morrie - By Jeffery Hatcher & Mitch Albom
Sorry... I'm Canadian - Conceived & Directed by Alex Mustakas
The Sound of Music - Music by Richard Rodgers
Spamalot - Book & Lyrics by Eric Idle
Weekend Comedy - By Sam Bobrick & Jeanne Bobrick
White Christmas - Based upon the Paramount Pictures Film Written for the Screen by Norman Krasna, Norman Panama & Melvin Frank

2012 season 
The Sound of Music
Perfect Wedding
Johnny and June  
The Melville Boys 
Blue Suede Shoes:  Memories of the King
Murder at Oakwood Resort   
Murder at Fern Resort 
Harvey
The Wizard of Oz
Big Band Legends   
9 To 5: The Musical
Annie
The Love List

2011 season 
Dance Legends 
Italian Funerals and Other Festive Occasions
How the Other Half Loves
How to Succeed in Business Without Really Trying
Who's Under Where?
Blue Suede Shoes: Memories of the King      
Hairspray
Blood Brothers
Guys and Dolls
The Wizard of Oz
The Melville Boys      
Shear Madness
Murder at the Best Western

2010 season 
On Golden Pond 
Cagney!
Cowgirls  
Guys and Dolls
Separate Beds
Sweet Charity
Country Legends    
Cagney!
Dance Legends
The 25th Annual Putnam County Spelling Bee
See How They Run
Tap Dogs
High School Musical
Twelve Angry Men
Peter Pan

2009 season 
Country Legends 
The Odd Couple
Blue Champagne  
See How They Run
Brigadoon
2 Pianos 4 Hands
Oliver!
Camelot
Evita
High School Musical
The Odd Couple
Moon Over Buffalo
Country Legends 
Caught in the Act II: Repeat Offenders 
Judy & David's Pig Mania 
Me and My Girl
The Heiress
Robin Hood

2008 season 
The Ballad of Stompin’ Tom 
The Mousetrap
The Drawer Boy
A Funny Thing Happened On The Way To The Forum
Steel Magnolias
Legends
I Love You, You're Perfect, Now Change
My Fair Lady
Sorry... I'm Canadian  
Dirty Rotten Scoundrels
Swing!
One for the Pot  
Cinderella
Forever Plaid

2007 season 
Cash On Delivery 
Jasper Station  
The Ladies of Broadway  
Funny Money  
Man of La Mancha
Mom's The Word  
Cats
The Last Resort  
Miss Saigon
Legends  
Buddy: The Buddy Holly Story
Caught In The Act
Legends
Judy & David's GoldiRocks
Crazy for You
The Christmas Show
The Foursome
Dads: The Musical

2006 season 
Anne of Green Gables
Not Now Darling
Sorry...I'm Canadian  
Twist and Shout: The British Invasion
The Foursome
Beauty and the Beast
Lost In Yonkers
Give My Regards To Broadway
Nunsense
Dial M For Murder
Cotton Patch Gospel
Cats
Corpse
Aladdin

2005 season 
Oklahoma!
Lost In Yonkers
The Last Resort
The World Goes Round 
Cotton Patch Gospel
Corpse 
Buddy: The Buddy Holly Story
The Mikado
42nd Street
Give My Regards To Broadway
Twist and Shout: The British Invasion
Beauty and the Beast
Lend Me A Tenor

2004 season 
42nd Street
Tons of Money
Moments To Remember  
Fiddler on the Roof
A Closer Walk With Patsy Cline
The Secret Garden
Swing!
The Cemetery Club
Man of La Mancha
Leader of the Pack
It Runs In The Family

2003 season 
Annie Get Your Gun
Caught In The Net  
Canadian Toonie
Vaudeville!  
Big River
Over The River and Through The Woods
Carousel
Buddy: The Buddy Holly Story
Joseph and the Amazing Technicolor Dreamcoat
Moments To Remember
A Closer Walk With Patsy Cline
Triple Espresso

2002 season 
Anything Goes
Give My Regards To Broadway
Shear Madness
Joseph and the Amazing Technicolor Dreamcoat
Move Over, Mrs. Markham 
Brighton Beach Memoirs
Pirates of Penzance
Weekend Comedy
Buddy: The Buddy Holly Story
Canadian Loonie

2001 season 
Little Me
A Bit Between The Teeth  
No Sex Please, We’re British
Evita
Dads: The Musical 
The Music Man
You'll Get Used To It: The War Show 
It Runs In The Family 
The Boyfriend
Swingtime Canteen 
Forever Plaid

2000 season 
Vaudeville! 
Over The River and Through The Woods
Damn Yankees
The Rainmaker
Lend Me A Tenor
It Runs In The Family
The King and I
Double-Double  
No Sex Please, We’re British
On Golden Pond
Crazy For You
Forever Plaid
A Closer Walk With Patsy Cline

1999 season 
Don't Dress for Dinner
Bye Bye Broadway  
The Nerd
Dames at Sea
Me and My Girl
Shear Madness
The Affections of May

1998 season 
Show Stoppers! 
A Bedfull of Foreigners
The Wild Guys  
Blood Brothers

1997 season 
The Sunshine Boys
Run For Your Wife
Romance/Romance
A Flea In Her Ear

1996 season 
She Loves Me
Bending the Bows  
Opening Night  
You'll Get Used To It: The War Show

1995 season 
Big River
Out of Order
Dads: The Musical

1994 season 
Swing!
The Affections of May 
Nunsense

1993 season 
Me and My Girl
It Runs In The Family  
Lend Me A Tenor

1992 season 
Hurray for Hollywood!  
Move Over, Mrs. Markham   
The Mikado

1991 season 
Vaudeville! 
Brighton Beach Memoirs
Pirates of Penzance

References

External Links - Drayton Entertainment Theatres 

 Drayton Festival Theatre
 Hamilton Family Theatre Cambridge
 Huron Country Playhouse
 Huron Country Playhouse II
 King's Wharf Theatre
 St. Jacobs Country Playhouse
 St. Jacobs Schoolhouse Theatre

Canadian theatre company production histories
Theatre companies in Ontario
Theatre in Ontario